Kim Chung-ha, better known by the mononym Chungha, is a South Korean singer. She finished fourth in Mnet's girl group survival show Produce 101 and was a member of the resulting girl group I.O.I. Chungha made her solo debut in June 2017 with extended play Hands on Me.


Awards and nominations

See also 
 List of awards and nominations received by I.O.I

Notes

References

Chungha